I Hear a Symphony is the eighth studio album released by American girl group the Supremes on the Motown label in 1966.

Overview
Positioned as a successful attempt to further bridge the gap between traditional pop music, the traditional Motown sound and soul, the album included the title track, the Supremes' sixth number-one single, and the Top Ten single "My World Is Empty Without You". Also included are the group's covers of pop standards such as "With a Song in My Heart", "Without a Song", "Stranger in Paradise" and "Wonderful! Wonderful!". The original plan was to have the Supremes record an entire album of pop standards, to be entitled There's a Place for Us. The album was indeed recorded but shelved and left unreleased by Motown until 2004.  The cover for I Hear a Symphony was the cover shot intended originally for There's a Place For Us. When that album was eventually released in 2004, an alternate shot from that photo session was used.

Also included are originals such as "Everything Is Good About You" and "Any Girl In Love (Knows What I'm Going Through)", and covers of the then-current hits "Yesterday" (originally by the Beatles), "A Lover's Concerto" (sung by the Toys) and "Unchained Melody" (popularized by the Righteous Brothers). "Everything Is Good About You" was yet another B-side that got substantive airplay and became a fan favorite. It was one of several such B-sides that would be included on the group's 1967 Greatest Hits collection.

The I Hear a Symphony album peaked at number 8 and remained on the Billboard 200 album chart for 55 weeks, on the strength of the title track and the top 5 "My World Is Empty Without You." While originally issued in both mono and stereo versions, several of the tracks on the released stereo edition of I Hear a Symphony were sourced from mono mixes.

The Supremes promoted the album with a successful European tour. While in Sweden, the grouped filmed a television special that incorporated a number of the songs on I Hear a Symphony. The DVD of the special is available under the title Greatest Hits: Live in Amsterdam.

Expanded edition
On September 21, 2012, Universal Music Group released I Hear A Symphony: Expanded Edition, a two-disc limited edition re-release. Disc one contains the digitally remastered original mono and stereo editions of the album, with most of the stereo edition being sourced from an alternate 1966 master done in true stereo as opposed to the original stereo LP release of the album. Also on disc one are alternate vocals and extended mixes, and an additional song "All Of A Sudden (My Heart Sings)," recorded for (but not included on) the original album. Disc two features a complete unreleased live show recorded at the Upper Deck of Detroit's Roostertail night club on September 26, 1966.

Track listing
All songs produced by Brian Holland & Lamont Dozier.

Side one
"Stranger in Paradise"  – 3:03
"Yesterday"  – 2:28
"I Hear a Symphony"  – 2:41
"Unchained Melody"  – 3:47
"With a Song in My Heart"  – 2:02
"Without a Song"  – 2:59

Side two
"My World Is Empty Without You"  – 2:33
"A Lover's Concerto"  – 2:35
"Any Girl in Love (Knows What I'm Going Through)"  – 2:59
"Wonderful! Wonderful!"  – 2:51
"Everything is Good About You"  – 2:59
"He's All I Got"  – 2:46

Personnel
Diana Ross – lead vocals
Florence Ballard - background vocals (side 1: tracks 1, 3-5; side 2: tracks 1-6)
Mary Wilson – background vocals (side 1: tracks 1, 3-5; side 2: tracks 1-6)
The Andantes – additional background vocals (side 2: track 3)
Brian Holland, Lamont Dozier – producers
Instrumentation by the Funk Brothers and assorted LA musicians:
Earl Van Dyke – piano (side 1: track 3), organ (side 2: track 1)
James Gittens – piano (side 2: track 1)
James Jamerson – bass (side 1: track 3; side 2: track 1) 
Richard "Pistol" Allen – drums (side 1: track 3)
Benny Benjamin – drums (side 2: track 1)
Jack Ashford – vibraphone (side 1: track 3; side 2: track 1)
Mike Terry – baritone saxophone (side 1: track 3; side 2: track 1) 
Eddie Willis – guitar (side 1: track 3)
Robert White – guitar (side 1: track 3)
Joe Messina – guitar (side 2: track 1)
The Detroit Symphony Orchestra – instrumentation (side 1: track 3; side 2: track 1)
Paul Riser – string arrangements (side 1: track 3; side 2: track 1)
Esther Gordy Edwards, J, Pryor – cover design

Charts

Weekly charts

Year-end charts

See also
List of number-one R&B albums of 1966 (U.S.)

References

1966 albums
The Supremes albums
Albums produced by Norman Whitfield
Albums produced by Brian Holland
Albums produced by Lamont Dozier
Motown albums
Albums recorded at Hitsville U.S.A.